Linda Nöjd (born 29 January 1983) is a retired Swedish footballer. Nöjd was part of the Djurgården Swedish champions' team of 2003. Despite being diagnosed with breast cancer and receiving chemotherapy, Nöjd continued playing football in the second tier of Sweden.

Honours

Club 
 Djurgården/Älvsjö 
 Damallsvenskan: 2003

References

Swedish women's footballers
Djurgårdens IF Fotboll (women) players
1983 births
Living people
Women's association footballers not categorized by position